The Pyramint was a brand of Terry's chocolate popular in the 1980s.  Created in 1988, it was designed to resemble an Egyptian pyramid made of dark chocolate with a mint-flavoured fondant inside. It was changed to a bar format with pyramid segments in 1991. The Pyramint continued to be marketed under the Terry's label after the brand was sold to Philip Morris-Suchard in 1992.

The Pyramint was discontinued in the 1990s due to falling demand.

References

External links
 

Brand name chocolate